The  Samsung Omnia W (also known as the Samsung Focus Flash and GT-I8350) is a slate device running Windows Phone operating system 7.5. The launch of the phone was first announced on September 26, 2011 and was subsequently released later that year. The phone is manufactured by Samsung. The device features Qualcomm Snapdragon MSM8255 SoC clocked at 1.4 GHz (with an Adreno 205 GPU), 3.7-inch Super AMOLED screen (protected by Corning Gorilla Glass) with a resolution of 480 x 800  and 8 GB of internal storage.

Reception
Early reviews have been positive.  PC World states that "… this is one of the best (and most affordable) Windows Phone 7 devices you can buy. If you have been looking for a good smartphone on a budget then this is the phone for you".  The Verge rated it at a 7.1 out of 10, touting its design, software, and performance, while suffering through poor call quality and camera performance.  Engadget praises the "unassuming phone", concluding that "You'll make some sacrifices on the camera, storage and battery fronts, but if you can live with that the Focus is a veritable steal".

See also
Windows Phone

References

Windows Phone devices
Samsung smartphones
Mobile phones introduced in 2011